The Night Journey is a 1981 novel by Kathryn Lasky.

Plot overview
Nana Sashie (an Ashkenazi Jewish woman born in Mykolaiv in what is now Ukraine) tells her great-grandchild, Rachel, of her escape from the Russian Empire during the early 1900s, when pogroms were common. Nana Sashie refuses to eat for a week with the intention of dying, and passes away. Before moving to Minnesota, Nana Sashie was married to Reuven Bloom for 40 years.

Open Court Reading took the book and shortened it, giving Rachel the name "Rache". The story starts with a background of the story and the story from Ed's gift – a samovar – and Nana Sashie looking upset.  When Rache sneaks into Nana Sashie's room to look at the samovar, she ends up hearing Nana's tale.

Awards 
1982: National Jewish Book Award in the Children's Literature category

References

1981 American novels
1981 children's books
American children's novels
Antisemitism in fiction
Novels by Kathryn Lasky
Novels set in Minnesota
Novels set in Russia
Russian-Jewish culture in the United States
Ukrainian-Jewish culture in the United States